The White Paradise (German: Das weisse Paradies) is a 1929 Austrian silent film directed by Max Neufeld and starring Fred Doederlein, Hilde Jennings and Hans Marr.

The film's sets were designed by the art director Artur Berger.

Cast
 Fred Doederlein as Kurt Bergen - Skilehrer  
 Hilde Jennings as Inge  
 Hans Marr as Kommerzialrat Krüger, ihr Vater  
 Illa Meery as Lucy Erskine  
 Hans Thimig as Donald Evans  
 Peter C. Leska as Olaf Hardt  
 Eugen Neufeld as John Bird  
 Clementine Plessner as Kramer-Resi

References

Bibliography
 Armin Loacker. Kunst der Routine: der Schauspieler und Regisseur Max Neufeld. Filmarchiv Austria, 2008.

External links

1929 films
Films directed by Max Neufeld
Austrian silent feature films
Films set in the Alps
Skiing films
Austrian black-and-white films